The 1976 Individual Speedway World Championship was the 31st edition of the official World Championship to determine the world champion rider.

England's Peter Collins became the first British World Speedway Champion since Peter Craven had won in 1962. Fellow Englishman Malcolm Simmons finished second with Australia's Phil Crump finishing third. 1976 was the first time since 1952 that no rider from either New Zealand or Sweden finished on the podium in the World Final.

British Qualification

British Final
 June 2, 1976
  Coventry, Brandon Stadium
 First 5 to Intercontinental Final

Swedish Qualification

Swedish Final
 May 25, 1976
  Linköping
 First 8 to Nordic Final

New Zealand Qualification

Australian Qualification

Australian Final
 February 13, 1976
  Adelaide
 First 8 to Austral-Asian Final

Intercontinental Round

Australasian  Final
 February 21, 1976
 Auckland
 First 4 to Intercontinental Final

Norwegian Final
 April 25, 1976
 Skien
 First 3 to Nordic Final

Danish Final
 April 25, 1976
 Vojens

Nordic Final
 June 2, 1976
  Norrköping

American Final
 , 1976
 Santa Monica
 First to Interconinental Final

Intercontinental Final
 June 26, 1976
  London, Wembley Stadium
 First 8 to World Final

Continental Round

Continental Final
 June 20, 1976
  Leningrad

World Final

September 5, 1976
 Chorzów, Silesian Stadium

References

Individual Speedway World Championship
World Individual
Individual Speedway
Individual Speedway
Speedway competitions in the United Kingdom
Speedway competitions in Sweden